Wong Nai Tau is a village in the Siu Lek Yuen area of Sha Tin District, Hong Kong.

Administration
Wong Nai Tau is a recognized village under the New Territories Small House Policy.

See also
 Kau Yeuk (Sha Tin)

References

External links

 Delineation of area of existing village Wong Nai Tau, Tai Che and Fa Sham Hang (Sha Tin) for election of resident representative (2019 to 2022)

Villages in Sha Tin District, Hong Kong
Siu Lek Yuen